Peter Johansson (born 2 April 1967 in Näsby, Örebro)  is a Swedish retired competitive figure skater. He is a four-time Swedish national champion. He currently works as a coach in Boston, Massachusetts  with Mark Mitchell.

Competitive career
Johansson competed at five European Figure Skating Championships, four World Figure Skating Championships, and the 1988 Winter Olympics. He won the Swedish Figure Skating Championships four consecutive times.

Coaching career
Johansson currently works as a coach at the Skating Club of Boston. With Mark Mitchell, he coaches many top-level skaters, including 2007 World Junior champion Stephen Carriere, 2008 Eastern Sectional champion Katrina Hacker, 2007 US National junior pewter medalist Curran Oi, 2007 Eastern Sectional champion Kylie Gleason, two time Junior Grand Prix gold medalist Juliana Cannarozzo, 2008 US National junior bronze medalist Brittney Rizo, 2009 US National Junior Champion Ross Miner, 2010 US National Junior Silver Medalist Yasmin Siraj, and 2012 Skate America Silver Medalist Christina Gao.  They formerly coached 2003 U.S. pewter medalist Scott Smith, 2007 US National silver medalist Emily Hughes, 2004 US National Junior silver medalist Jason Wong, 2003 US National Novice bronze medalist Jessica Houston, and 2003 US National Junior Champion Erica Archambault.

Johansson and Mitchell were the 2003, 2006, and 2007 USFSA/PSA Developmental Coaches of the Year and the 2006 USOC Developmental Coaches of the Year.

Other 
Johansson also completed the 2008 Boston Marathon in a time of 4:10:10.

Competitive highlights

WD = Withdrew

References

The Inside Edge with Sarah and Drew: Side by Side
Rinkside at the U.S. Championships, Part 5- Mitchell, Johansson busy by the boards in Cleveland
 Sports-reference profile
 Skatabase: 1980s Euros
 Skatabase: 1980s Worlds
 Skatabase: 1980s Olympics
 Skatabase: 1990s Euros
 Skatabase: 1990s Worlds
 Swedish Olympic Committee bio 
   
Results

External links
 Skating Club of Boston

Swedish male single skaters
Olympic figure skaters of Sweden
Figure skaters at the 1988 Winter Olympics
Swedish figure skating coaches
1967 births
Living people
Sportspeople from Örebro
American Olympic coaches
Swedish expatriate sportspeople in the United States